The following highways are numbered 55A:

United States
 County Road 55A (Dixie County, Florida)
 County Road 55A (Gilchrist County, Florida)
 County Road 55A (Levy County, Florida)
Missouri Route 55A (former)
 Nebraska Spur 55A
 New York State Route 55A